Close to Me is a British television psychological drama based on the book of the same name by Amanda Reynolds. It stars Connie Nielsen as a Danish translator who loses a year of her memory following a fall. Christopher Eccleston, Susan Lynch, Leanne Best, Rosy McEwen, Tom Taylor, and Ellie Haddington also star. The six-part series commenced on Channel 4 in November 2021, with all episodes made available for streaming concurrently.

Synopsis 

Danish language interpreter Jo Harding (Connie Nielsen) suffers head trauma after a fall in her home, causing her to lose her memory of the past year. Harding works to piece her memories together along with her husband Rob (Christopher Eccleston) to understand what happened to her, and in doing so learns that her life was not as perfect as she thought it was.

Cast 

 Connie Nielsen as Jo Harding, a woman who loses a year of her memory following brain trauma.
 Christopher Eccleston as Rob Harding, Jo's husband.
 Rosy McEwen as Sash Harding, Jo and Rob's adult daughter.
 Tom Taylor as Finn Harding, Jo and Rob's adult son.
 Susan Lynch as Cathy, Jo's best friend.
 Ellie Haddington as Wendy, Jo and Rob's neighbour.
 Leanne Best as Anna, Rob's colleague.
 Henning Jensen as Frederik, Jo's father.
 Ray Fearon as Nick, Jo's boss.
 Nick Blood as Thomas, Sash's boyfriend.
 Jamie Flatters as Owen
 Lorraine Burroughs as Helen
 Zoe Croft as Ella

Episodes

Production 
Close to Me was the first English-language drama produced by Nordic Entertainment Group's British subsidiary, NENT Studios UK. The show was filmed mostly in Hemel Hempstead, Hertfordshire and Hastings. It was filmed during the COVID-19 pandemic in the United Kingdom.

References

External links 
 Official website
 

2021 British television series debuts
2021 British television series endings
2020s British drama television series
2020s British television miniseries
Channel 4 television dramas
English-language television shows
Television shows set in East Sussex